The ATIV Book 9 is a brand for group of computers that are part of ATIV laptop computer product line from Samsung Electronics Inc.  Book 9 is the flagship product of ATIV line up and is designed with performance and portability in mind.  All models come with either Intel Core i5 or i7 CPUs and solid-state drive(SSD) storage.  The thinnest model of being  thickness, ATIV Book 9 is among the thinnest laptop computers in the world.  

A group of Book 9 models come with different specifications.  As of February, 2014, there are three 13-inch models and two 15-inch models in the ATIV Book 9 line up.  Book 9 Plus model has a 13.3" touchscreen panel with qHD+ (3200 x 1800) resolution display and aluminum single-shell body.  Book 9 consists of 13.3" display size model with FHD (1920 x 1080) resolution and magnesium enclosure, and 15.6" display size model with FHD resolution display with single-shell body.  Two additional models with plastic enclosure is also offered; Book 9 Lite with 13.3" HD resolution display and AMD CPU and Book 9 Style with 15.6" FHD resolution display. An updated version was released in 2015 The ATIV Book 9, Book 9 Pro, Book 9 Plus and Book 9 Spin.

History

First Generation
The first Book 9 was introduced as Series9 at January 6, 2011 at the Consumer Electronics Show(CES) on and won the Best of CES award in the Laptop category. The first model had Sandy Bridge Intel Core i5 processor, 128GB solid-state drive(SSD) and a 13.3" HD (1366 x 768) display with 300 nit of brightness.

On May 4, 2011, Samsung Electronics also introduced 11.6" display version of the Series9 in Korea market. It had same design identity, specification and exterior material as the 13.3" model except the display size and CPU of Intel Core i3-380UM. Two months later, an updated CPU version with Intel Core i5-2537M was introduced to the Korean market to test the market perception of a smaller screen laptop. The original intention was to compete against MacBook Air line up with same screen size models, but due to sluggish demand of smaller screen size model, the 11-inch model was ceased by the end of the year and consequently, the global release was canceled as well. Newly developed 15-inch model superseded the 11-inch model in order to meet the larger-screen preference of the Korean market and later, it was introduced worldwide.

Second Generation
The second generation of Series9 was announced to the public at the CE Show on January 8, 2012. The new model had same display size of 13.3" but the resolution was stepped up from HD (1366 x 768) to HD+ (1600 x 900) and the brightness was increased from 300 nit to 400 nit. Design was refined and the material of the enclosure was changed from duralumin to aluminium single-shell body. The user was offered a choice of 128GB SSD as well as larger 256GB SSD for the storage. It was introduced with Sandy Bridge Intel Core i5 processor at the CE Show but 3 months later, it was upgraded to the Ivy Bridge Intel Core i5 processor before the hitting the market. Magnesium enclosure version with exact same design was also released in August 2012. Although the second generation Series9 didn't win the Best of CE Show award as its predecessor had, it was the final contender in the laptop category.

In March 2012, the 15.0" display version of the Series9 was announced to the market with HD+ resolution display.  It had same specification as its 13.3" counterpart but introduced to the market with Ivy Bridge Intel Core i5 processor from the beginning.  The Magnesium enclosure version was also introduced in July 2012.

Third Generation
At the beginning of 2013, Samsung Electronics changed the marketing name of all of its computer line up to ATIV and consequently, Series9 became ATIV Book 9.  
Between March and April 2013, all the models with 13.3" displays were upgraded from HD+ to FHD (1920 x 1080).

On June 20, 2013, during the "Samsung Premiere 2013: Galaxy & ATIV" event at London, ATIV Book 9 Plus and ATIV Book 9 Lite was introduced to public.  Book 9 Plus featured Haswell Intel Core i5 processor and 13.3" qHD+ (3200 x 1800) resolution display with touchscreen panel.  Although it was equipped with qHD+ display, initial advertisement showed it as having FHD resolution display due to lack of qHD+ driver support of Windows 8.0.  This issue has been resolved with the arrival of Windows 8.1 and all Book 9 Plus models currently have an option to choose qHD+ resolution once the Windows 8.1 is installed even though the previous advertisement showed FHD in its specification.

Book 9 Lite has plastic enclosure but it still retains the "Thin & Light" design identity of Book 9 family.  It is equipped with AMD quad-core A6-1450 APU with Radeon HD8250 GPU and HD resolution display.  The performance of the APU was relatively low but the overall speed was compensated by the SSD.  It was marketed toward casual computer users who mainly use the device for web browsing and email checking, not computation-intensive application users.   

On January 7, 2014, Samsung Electronics announced the new ATIV Book 9 2014 Edition at CES 2014.  The screen size was increased from 15.0" to 15.6" from the previous 15 inch Book 9 and the resolution was upgraded from HD to FHD as well.  It was announced as the world's first laptop PC to have native lossless audio up to 24bit/192 kHz, such as FLAC and ALAC, playback feature.  Due to 48 kHz audio playback limitation of Windows operating system, a dedicated lossless audio player software, S Player+, was also developed and shipped with the product.  It also marketed as having the longest battery running time of 14 hours in 15-inch class laptop computers.  This model also was a final contender to the throne at the Best of CE Show laptop category. Although announced in January 2014, it had not yet marketed, till end of May 2014.

Later in the same month, Book 9 Style, another 15 inch Book 9 was introduced to the Korean market.  It had similar design and specification as Book 9 2014 Edition, except having plastic enclosure and lack of lossless sound playback feature.  However, it was equipped with two powerful speakers with 4W of output each.  Also the exterior has leather-like texture finish with faux stitch design on the edge of the computer. 

All the new Book 9 models that are announced in 2014 include new features such as high current USB port for tablet charging, AptX codec for high quality audio transmission over Bluetooth, Dolby Virtual 5.1 surround sound effect and remote controllable audio port.

Design
The main design philosophy of ATIV Book 9 is "Thin & Light" and the design motive came from bent sheet of a paper to hint its thin and lightness.  In order to make the product durable while maintaining the light weight, aerospace grade duralumin was chosen for enclosure.  The design philosophy and the motive remained the same during the second and third iteration of the design but the material was changed to aluminium due to better manufacturability and easiness of putting fine details.  Later, a magnesium variant was also added to offer an even lighter option.

Initially, the line up included 11-inch screen-size model and 13-inch screen-size model but the 11-inch version was dropped by the end of 2011 due to the low popularity in Korean market. Instead, 15-inch model superseded 11-inch one in early 2012.

The first plastic enclosure version with 13-inch screen, Book 9 Lite, was added to the line up in 2013. It had similar design identity with other models in the line up, it was configured to have low cost CPU with plastic exterior in order to meet the demand from those who preferred the sleek design of Book 9 yet conscious about budget.  The 15-inch version of the Book 9 Lite was released to the market in 2014 with the marketing name of "Book 9 Style", however, this model had same configuration as Book 9 2014 Edition in terms of performance.

Awards

2014 Consumer Reports #1 Rank in 15-16 inch Laptop Category
2014 PC Magazine Reader's Choice Award
 2013 iF Design Award
 2012 iF Design Award
 2012 Good Design Award
 2011 DFA(Design For Asia) Award 'Bronze' prize
 2011 IDEA Design Award - Final List
 2011 CES Innovation Awards
 2011 TCO Design Award

Specifications

13-inch models

11-inch and 15-inch models

Timeline of ATIV Book 9

Notes

References

External links

 

Samsung laptops